Lauren Gregg (born July 20, 1960) is an American soccer coach and retired soccer player who played as a defender or midfielder. She made one appearance for the United States women's national soccer team in 1986. She was the first-ever female assistant coach for any of the United States' national teams between 1987 and 2000, and was interim head coach of the United States women's national soccer team in 1997 and 2000. As head coach of the women's soccer team at the University of Virginia from 1986 to 1995, Gregg was the first woman to lead a team to the NCAA Division I Final Four and to be named NSCAA Coach of the Year.

Gregg is a physician, as well as the co-author of The Champion Within: Training for Excellence.

Playing career
Gregg attended Wellesley High School, where she competed in swimming and lettered in basketball, softball, field hockey, and soccer. She had played field hockey until soccer was offered at the school. Gregg attended Lehigh University and began playing for the women's soccer team, which only had club status. She later tried out for the men's junior varsity soccer team and earned a place in the squad. She was also a member of the women's varsity basketball and lacrosse teams at the school. After two years, she was admitted on a one-year visiting student status to Harvard University. She played for the Harvard Crimson women's team in 1980, which finished third at the AIAW women's soccer tournament, and scored ten goals for the team. Gregg was chosen as a First Team All-American in 1981, and was included in the ACC All-Conference Team and the All-Region Team.

After her visiting student term had ended at Harvard, Gregg enrolled at the University of North Carolina at Chapel Hill in 1981. She played for the North Carolina Tar Heels women's soccer team in 1981 and 1982. She helped North Carolina win the AIAW championship in 1981, and the first NCAA championship in 1982. During her college career, she scored 20 goals and recorded 14 assists in 44 games for the Tar Heels. Gregg was selected as an NSCAA Third Team All-American and was included in the AIAW All-Tournament Team in 1981, and in both seasons was selected in the ACC All-Conference Team and the All-Region Team. She was also included in the Academic All-America third team in 1983, and received the Marie James Award, a postgraduate scholarship.

Gregg earned one cap for the United States women's national soccer team in 1986.

Coaching career
Gregg was the head coach for the women's soccer team at the University of Virginia from 1986 to 1995. During her tenure, she led the team to the NCAA Final Four in 1991 and seven consecutive NCAA tournament bids from 1988 to 1994. In 1990, she was named the NSCAA Coach of the Year becoming the first woman to receive the honor. She was also the first woman to lead a team to the NCAA Division I Final Four. She was an assistant coach for the United States women's national team that won the 1991 and 1999 Women's World Cups and gold at the 1996 Summer Olympics.

Gregg served as head coach for the United States under-21 women's national soccer team and guided the team to Nordic Cup championship titles in 1997 and 1999. She was interim head coach of the U.S. national team for one match in 1997 against South Korea (which finished as a 6–1 win) as Tony DiCicco missed the match due to a family commitment. She again served as the interim head coach for three games in 2000 at the Australia Cup after DiCicco stepped down.

In 2007, Gregg was inducted into the Virginia–D.C. Soccer Hall of Fame for meritorious service.

Personal life
Gregg was born in Rochester, Minnesota, to James Alan Gregg and Veronica Anne "Ronnie" Nowick, and has four siblings. At the age of ten, her family moved to Wellesley, Massachusetts. She graduated summa cum laude with a Bachelor of Arts in psychology from the University of North Carolina at Chapel Hill in 1983, and earned a Master of Education from Harvard University in 1985. Her daughter, Meilin Gregg, also is a member of the North Carolina Tar Heels women's soccer team.

Career statistics

International

Honors

Player
Harvard Crimson
 AIAW Women's Soccer Tournament third place: 1980

North Carolina Tar Heels
 AIAW Women's Soccer Tournament: 1981
 NCAA Division I Women's Soccer Championship: 1982

United States
 North America Cup: 1986

Individual
 First Team All-American: 1980
 NSCAA Third Team All-American: 1981
 ACC All-Conference Team: 1980, 1981, 1982
 All-Region Team:  1980, 1981, 1982
 AIAW All-Tournament Team: 1981
 Academic All-America Third Team: 1983

Coach
United States (as assistant coach)
 FIFA Women's World Cup: 1991, 1999; third place: 1995
 Women's Olympic Tournament: 1996

United States U21
 Nordic Cup: 1997, 1999; runner-up: 1998

Individual
 ACC Coach of the Year: 1989
 NSCAA Coach of the Year: 1991
 South Region Regional Coach of the Year: 1991

References

Further reading
 Grainey, Timothy (2012), Beyond Bend It Like Beckham: The Global Phenomenon of Women's Soccer, University of Nebraska Press, 
 Gregg, Lauren (1999), The Champion Within, J T C Sports Inc, 
 Hawkes, Nena and John F.A. Seggar (2000), Celebrating Women Coaches: A Biographical Dictionary, Greenwood Publishing Group, 
 Lisi, Clemente A. (2010), The U.S. Women's Soccer Team: An American Success Story, Scarecrow Press, 
 Longman, Jere (2009), The Girls of Summer: The U.S. Women's Soccer Team and How it Changed the World, HarperCollins, 
 Williams, Jean (2003), A Game for Rough Girls?: A History of Women's Football in Britain", Routledge, 0415263387
 Williams, Jean (2007), A Beautiful Game: International Perspectives on Women's Football', Berg,

External links
 NSCAA Academy profile

1960 births
Living people
Sportspeople from Rochester, Minnesota
Soccer players from Minnesota
People from Wellesley, Massachusetts
Sportspeople from Norfolk County, Massachusetts
Soccer players from Massachusetts
American women's soccer players
United States women's international soccer players
Lehigh University alumni
Harvard Crimson women's soccer players
North Carolina Tar Heels women's soccer players
Women's association football defenders
Women's association football midfielders
Female association football managers
American women's soccer coaches
Virginia Cavaliers women's soccer coaches
United States women's national soccer team managers
Harvard Graduate School of Education alumni